J. T. Rogers is an American playwright who lives in New York. 

Rogers’s plays include Oslo, Blood and Gifts, The Overwhelming, White People, and Madagascar. In 2017, Rogers' Oslo won the Tony Award for Best Play, the Drama Desk Award for Outstanding Play, the Obie Award for Best New American Theatre Work, the Lucille Lortel Award for Best Play, the Outer Critics Circle Award for Outstanding New Broadway Play, and the Drama League Award for Outstanding Production of a Play,.

Rogers is the creator, writer and showrunner for the HBO Max television series Tokyo Vice, starring Ansel Elgort and Ken Watanabe  The eight-episode first season aired in 2022. Tokyo Vice was renewed for a second season, scheduled to air in 2023. His film of Oslo Tony Award-winning Oslo for HBO, directed by Bartlett Sher and executive produced by Steven Spielberg is available on HBO and HBO Max and was nominated for two Emmy Awards.

Education
Rogers attended Rock Bridge High School in Columbia, Missouri, and graduated from the University of North Carolina School of the Arts in 1990, where he studied acting. He also received an honorary doctorate from UNCSA in 2009. Rogers serves on the board of the Dramatists Legal Defense Fund.

Career
Rogers has indicated that his playwriting interests include: "stories... framed against great political rupture... [about people] who struggle with, and against... [unfolding] world events — and who are [permanently changed] through that struggle."

J. T. Rogers' play Madagascar is set in a hotel room overlooking the Spanish Steps in Rome. It is about a mysterious disappearance that haunts the life of the play's three characters. It was commissioned by and had its world premiere at the Salt Lake Acting Company in November 2004. The play received the American Theatre Critics Association's 2004 M. Elizabeth Osborn Award and the 2005 Pinter Review Prize for Drama, which included its first publication by the University of Tampa Press and a related public dramatic reading. It was also a finalist for the ATCA's Steinberg New Play Award and performed at the Summer Play Festival in New York City in July 2005. The play had its Australian premiere at the Melbourne Theatre Company in February 2010, directed by Sam Strong.<ref>Broadbent, Penelope. "Madagascar] australianstage.com.au, February 19, 2010</ref> The play had its European debut at London's Theatre 503 in May 2010, directed by Tom Littler and featuring Sorcha Cusack, Barry Stanton and Miranda Foster. 

His play The Overwhelming, in which an American family who arrive in Kigali, Rwanda, in early 1994, must confront life-and-death realities of the Rwandan genocide, had its world premiere at the Cottesloe Theatre, Royal National Theatre, London, in association with Out of Joint, in May 2006. It then toured throughout the UK and was performed on BBC radio. Its American premiere was at the Roundabout Theatre in September 2007. He received the Otis Guernsey New Voices Playwriting Award at the 2007 William Inge Theatre Festival in Independence, Kansas. The Overwhelming has since been done throughout the world, and it was selected as a Top 10 Play of the Year by Time Magazine, Time Out New York and the Chicago TribuneIt was also nominated for Best Play of the Year by London's South Bank Show and Boston's Elliot Norton Awards.

In 2009, Rogers was the sole American playwright along with 11 British authors to create The Great Game: Afghanistan for the Tricycle Theatre, London. The cycle of plays was a sensation, garnering an Olivier nomination for all involved.

His White People, which had its world première at the Philadelphia Theatre Company and then received the L.A. Drama Critics Circle and John Barrymore Award nominations for "Best Play of the Year". The revised play was produced by Starry Night Entertainment Off-Broadway in 2009, and has been seen at the English Theatre of Berlin. The play was seen in repertory with Madagascar at the Road Theatre in Los Angeles in 2010. His Seeing the Elephant was nominated for the Joseph Kesselring Prize for "Best New American Play", and his play Murmuring in a Dead Tongue was produced by Epic Rep, in New York City, where he is a company member, in its 2003–2004 season. In 2008, it was mounted as part of the inaugural DC Theater Alliance.

Rogers wrote the full-length play Blood and Gifts, which debuted at the Lyttelton Theatre, Royal National Theatre, London, in September 2010, starring Lloyd Owen with direction by Howard Davies. The play premiered in the US Off-Broadway in October 2011 at the Lincoln Center Newhouse Theater, directed by Bartlett Sher. Charles Isherwood, in his review in The New York Times, wrote that the play was "superb", with a "first rate production...the characters...really seem to be living in this turbulent history..." The reviewer for The Guardian, Michael Billington, criticised the writer's "advantage of hindsight which lends much of the action a self-conscious irony" but otherwise praised him for a "complex, demanding play." The play was nominated for the 2012 Lucille Lortel Award for Outstanding Play and Outstanding Lead Actor, Jefferson Mays and the 2012 Outer Critics Circle Award for Outstanding New Off-Broadway Play and Outstanding Featured Actor in a Play, Jefferson Mays.

Rogers' 2016 political drama Oslo became his most successful work to date, including a highly acclaimed Broadway run. Oslo premiered Off-Broadway at the Lincoln Center Newhouse Theatre to nearly universal acclaim. Oslo transferred to the Lincoln Center Beaumont Theatre, a Broadway house, where it opened on April 13, 2017. Of the larger Broadway production, Ben Brantley of the New York Times wrote that "J. T. Rogers's Oslo, an against-the-odds story of international peacemaking, is undeniably a big play, as expansive and ambitious as any in recent Broadway history. So it is particularly gratifying to announce that it has been allowed to stretch to its full height in the thrilling production that opened on Thursday night, directed with a master's hand by Bartlett Sher." Oslo's cast features Jennifer Ehle and Jefferson Mays, who also appeared in the Off-Broadway production.

The Broadway production won seven awards for Best New Play, including the prestigious 2017 Tony Award for Best New Play.  After Broadway, Oslo transferred to London for a September 2017 run at the Royal National Theater, followed by a three-month transfer to the Harold Pinter Theatre in London's West End. [50] The London production was nominated for the 2017 Best Play by the Evening Standard Theater Awards and the 2018 Best New Play by the Laurence Olivier Awards. In 2018, Oslo opened in Tel Aviv, Israel, in South Korea by the National Theater Company of Korea, and later in Norway and Germany. The New National Theater in Japan ran the production in 2021, 

Rogers's plays are published by TCG Books and Nick Hern, and Dramatists Play Service in acting editions. His essays have appeared in The New York Times, The Guardian, New Statesman, and American Theatre.

Rogers was selected as one of ten playwrights in the United States to receive a NEA/TCG Theatre Residency for 2004–2005, through which he was playwright in residence at the Salt Lake Acting Company (Salt Lake City). In 2004 and 2008, Rogers was awarded playwriting fellowships from the New York Foundation for the Arts. His plays are published by Faber and Faber in the US and UK and in acting editions in the US through Dramatists Play Service and Playscripts. Rogers is a member of the Dramatists Guild and a resident playwright at New Dramatists. In 2012, he won a John Simon Guggenheim Memorial Foundation Fellowship for his work.

Plays
 Oslo (2016)
 Blood and Gifts (2011)
 The Overwhelming (2004)
 Madagascar (2004)
 Murmuring in a Dead Tongue (1998; 2003)
 Seeing the Elephant White People Above the Beasts Bob Comes to Life Frankfurt Penetrating Malaysia Guy Talk Lionel's Blue Chicks 'N Beer The Saddest LinesFilm

Rogers wrote the screenplay for a filmed version of his Tony Award-winning play Oslo. The film starred Ruth Wilson and Andrew Scott and was directed by Tony-winner Bartlett Sher, who helmed the Broadway play. Steven Spielberg and Marc Platt served as executive producers alongside Rogers, Sher, and Cambra Overend. It is a production of HBO and Endeavor Content.

Television

Rogers wrote the television drama Tokyo Vice, based on the non-fiction book by Jake Adelstein.  The eight-part series was produced for HBO Max and stars Ansel Elgort, playing Adelstein, an American journalist who embeds himself into the Tokyo Vice police squad to reveal corruption.  The first episode was directed by Michael Mann. The series also features Ken Watanabe, Odessa Young, and Ella Rumpf.  It chronicles Jake's daily descent into the underbelly of Tokyo, where nothing and no one is what or who they seem.

Rogers is currently writing a TV series for Netflix.

It was renewed for a second season that is currently in production.

See also
 Rwandan genocide
 Bibliography of the Rwandan Genocide

References

External links
 J.T. Rogers Official Website. March 2017.
 American Theatre Critics Association press release. Online posting.  11 Feb. 2005.
 Play Penn Press Release.  29 June 2006.
 The Overwhelming, by J. T. Rogers.  Production information.  Online posting.  The Overwhelming (Out of Joint)  produced in association with the Royal National Theatre.  World première, London.  May 2006.
 Rogers, J. T.  Madagascar''.  Tampa: U of Tampa Press, 2005.  [http://www.new-theatre.org/rogers.php New Theatre (Florida) press release
 Dramatists Play Service Company website
 "White People" Official Website
 New Dramatists Playwright Profile
 J. T. Rogers - Laura Pels Keynote Address
 The Independent - Ideas America Won't Entertain
 J. T. Rogers - Studio 180 Essay on Rwandan Genocide
 The Overwhelming - The New Statesmen (London)

1968 births
University of North Carolina School of the Arts alumni
Works about the Rwandan genocide
21st-century American dramatists and playwrights
Living people
Writers from Columbia, Missouri
Rock Bridge High School alumni
Truman State University people
American male dramatists and playwrights
21st-century American male writers
20th-century American male writers
20th-century American dramatists and playwrights